Barton is an unincorporated community in western Marshall County, Mississippi, United States.  It is located at the intersection of State Highway 302 (Goodman Road) and State Highway 309 (Byhalia Road).

Notable person

Aviator Bennett Griffin, who once held a record time for crossing the Atlantic, was born in Barton.

References

Unincorporated communities in Marshall County, Mississippi
Unincorporated communities in Mississippi
Memphis metropolitan area